Jen Sincero (born August 7, 1965) is an American writer, speaker and success coach.

Early life and education 
Jen Sincero was born and raised in Westchester, New York. The daughter of Italian-born Domenico Sincero, a doctor, and Susan Sincero, she attended Briarcliff High School and later Colorado College, where she graduated in 1987 with a BA in English. Sincero worked in the marketing department at CBS/Epic Records in the 1990s during which time she co-founded her first band, Crotch, Sincero moved to Albuquerque, New Mexico, in 1996, where she started the Jenny Clinkscales Band and later 60 Foot Queenie, a solo project.

Career 
In 2000, Sincero moved to Los Angeles, California, and worked as a freelance writer, writing marketing materials for the recording industry, magazine articles, blogs and performing spoken word. Her first book, Don't Sleep With Your Drummer (MTV Books, 2003), a semi-autobiographical novel about a rock band, was optioned for TV development by both HBO and Oxygen. Her second book, The Straight Girl's Guide to Sleeping With Chicks (Simon & Schuster, 2005), was a national bestseller.

In 2008, Sincero began facilitating business development workshops for the women's entrepreneurial organization, Ladies Who Launch, and later started her own practice as a success coach.

Her third book, You Are A Badass: How to Stop Doubting Your Greatness and Start Living an Awesome Life (Running Press, 2013), has sold over 5 million copies, is a #1 New York Times bestseller, is available in over 40 languages and has spawned calendars, motivational buttons, day planners and the follow-up books You Are a Badass at Making Money: Master the Mindset of Wealth (Viking, 2017), which was also a New York Times bestseller, You Are a Badass Everyday: How to Keep Your Motivation Strong, Your Vibe High, and Your Quest for Transformation Unstoppable (Viking, 2018), and Badass Habits: Cultivate the Awareness, Boundaries and Daily Upgrades you Need to Make Them Stick (Viking 2020).

Honors and awards 
In 2014, Sincero's narration of You Are a Badass won her an Audie Award, an annual award given by the American Audio Publishers Association for audiobooks and spoken-word entertainment.

In 2015, You Are a Badass became a New York Times bestseller, hit #1 and has remained in the top ten on the NY Times bestseller list for over five years.

Badass Habits was a finalist for the 2022 Audie Award for Business/Personal Development

Published works

2003 – Don't Sleep With Your Drummer (MTV Books)–  
2005 – The Straight Girl's Guide to Sleeping With Chicks (Simon & Schuster) –  
2013 – You Are A Badass: How to Stop Doubting Your Greatness and Start Living an Awesome Life (Running Press) – 
2017 – You Are a Badass at Making Money: Master the Mindset of Wealth (Viking) –  
2018 – You Are a Badass Everyday: How to Keep Your Motivation Strong, Your Vibe High, and Your Quest for Transformation Unstoppable (Viking) –  
2020 – Badass Habits: Cultivate the Awareness, Boundaries, and Daily Upgrades You Need to Make Them Stick (Penguin Life) –

References

External links 
 Official website

1965 births
Living people
American women non-fiction writers
21st-century American women writers
People from Westchester County, New York